Kessels is a Dutch toponymic surname indicating an origin in one of a variety of places named Kessel in the Low Countries.  Notable people with the surname include:

Erik Kessels (born 1966), Dutch artist, designer and curator, co-founder of KesselsKramer advertising agency
Hendrik Johan Kessels (1781–1849), Dutch clockmaker active in Denmark
Hubert Kessels (fl. 1959–62), economist and a governor of the Bank of Ghana
Koen Kessels (born 1960/61), Belgian conductor and music director
Marie Kessels (born 1954), Dutch poet and prose writer
Mathieu Kessels (1784–1836), Dutch Neoclassical sculptor 
Paulus Kessels (1901–1987), Dutch sports shooter

See also
J. Kessels, a Dutch drama film 
Kessel (disambiguation)

References

Dutch-language surnames
Surnames of Dutch origin
Toponymic surnames